Carem or Karem is a place mentioned in the Septuagint translation of the Hebrew Bible as being a town situated in the hill country of the tribe of Judah, while the Masoretic Text and Vulgate do not mention the name (see ).

Identification
According to the Catholic Encyclopedia, Carem has been identified by some scholars with Beit HaKerem (Bethhaccerem), a town that is mentioned in the biblical Book of Jeremiah  and Book of Nehemiah .

It is most often associated with Ein Karem, a town currently included in the municipality of Jerusalem.

The tradition thus identifies Ein Karem as the birthplace of John the Baptist. Many Christians cite the existence of manuscripts as evidence in favour of this tradition. However, early writers such as St. Jerome and later scholars like Baronius contradict this theory by citing the breadth of the term 'city of Judah' and the unlikelihood that it necessarily refers to this particular city.

See also 
Ayn Karim, about the Palestinian history of Ein Karem

References

New Testament places